Harmony is an unincorporated community in Roane County, West Virginia, United States.

The community took its name from a local church.

References

Unincorporated communities in Roane County, West Virginia
Unincorporated communities in West Virginia